Subhasini Ali   (born 29 December 1947) is an Indian Marxist politician and a leader and Polit Buro Member of the Communist Party of India (Marxist). She is also the former President of the All India Democratic Women's Association and former Member of Parliament from Kanpur.

Early life and education
Subhashini Ali is the daughter of Colonel Prem Sehgal  and Captain Lakshmi Sehgal  (née Dr. Lakshmi Swaminathan) who were a part of the Indian National Army. She attended Welham Girls' School in Dehradun. She did her bachelor's degree from Women's Christian College in Madras and later did her master's degree from the Kanpur University.

Political career

As a trade Unionist and leader of the All India Democratic Women's Association, she was once very influential in the politics of Kanpur where the Communist Party of India (CPI) held sway over trade unions and which elected CPI-supported S.M. Banerjee to Lok Sabha four times from 1957 to 1971. This influence of CPI helped her win the General elections of 1989 to the parliament and she defeated her nearest rival BJP candidate by 56,587 votes from Kanpur. The CPI influence waned after the emergency in 1977 and she lost the General elections of 1996 by 151,090 votes. She finished at the fifth place in the General elections of 2004 polling only 4558 votes (0.74%). She fought the General elections of 2014 from Barrackpore as a CPI(M) candidate but lost.

She is currently a member of the Central Committee of the Communist Party of India (Marxist). She was inducted to the polit bureau (PB) of Communist Party of India (Marxist) in 2015 thereby becoming the second women member in PB after Brinda Karat.

Films
Subhashini Ali designed period costumes for 1981 classic, Umrao Jaan, directed by her then-husband Muzaffar Ali. She also dabbles in amateur acting, and her first starring role was in Asoka in 2001, followed by an English feature, The Guru, in 2002, and was seen again in 2005, with her fellow party member, Brinda Karat in the film Amu.

She inspired the film Anjuman (1986) directed by teetam pandee panree Muzaffar Ali with her struggles in Kanpur with the AIDWA.

Personal life
She was previously married to filmmaker  Muzaffar Ali. Their son Shaad Ali is a film maker who is most well known for directing Saathiya, Bunty aur Babli, Jhoom Barabar Jhoom, and Ok Jaanu. He married Shazmeen Hussain, daughter of famous conceptual artist Rummana Hussain and businessman Ishaat Hussain, in 2006 but they divorced in 2011. In 2013, he married Aarti Patkar.

Ali is an Atheist. She is the cousin of Indian classical dancer Mallika Sarabhai, daughter of her mother's sister Mrinalini Sarabhai and scientist Vikram Sarabhai.

See also
 Swaminathan family

References

External links
 A life in Service, an article by Subhashini Ali on her family history and her mother
 Official biographical sketch in Parliament of India website

Indian atheists
Communist Party of India (Marxist) politicians from Uttar Pradesh
Politicians from Kanpur
Women in Uttar Pradesh politics
Living people
India MPs 1989–1991
Lok Sabha members from Uttar Pradesh
Communist Party of India (Marxist) candidates in the 2014 Indian general election
1947 births
20th-century Indian women politicians
20th-century Indian politicians
21st-century Indian women politicians
21st-century Indian politicians
Women members of the Lok Sabha
Women's Christian College, Chennai alumni
Welham Girls' School alumni
Marxist feminists
Atheist feminists